Stephen Cheeke is an author and senior lecturer in English at the University of Bristol. He attended Kings of Wessex School with comedian Richard Herring,
and then went on to read English at the University of Cambridge, where he formed half of a stand-up double-act, God and Jesus, with Simon Munnery. Since his appointment as lecturer at Bristol in 1994, Cheeke has published articles on Shelley, Byron, and Romanticism. In 2007, he was awarded the Keats-Shelley Association of America's essay prize.
Cheeke's publications include Byron and Place: History, Translation, Nostalgia,
and Writing for Art: The Aesthetics of Ekphrasis.

Renowned amongst Bristol students for his entertaining and insightful lectures, Cheeke even has his own fan club on Facebook: the "Stephen Cheeke Appreciation Society".

References

External links 
 

Living people
Year of birth missing (living people)
English writers
People educated at The Kings of Wessex School